The Intermontane Plate was an ancient oceanic tectonic plate that lay on the west coast of North America about 195 million years ago. The Intermontane Plate was surrounded by a chain of volcanic islands called the Intermontane Islands, which had been accumulating as a volcanic chain in the Pacific Ocean since the Triassic period, beginning around 245 million years ago. The volcanism records yet another subduction zone. Beneath the far edge of the Intermontane microplate, another plate called the Insular Plate was sinking. This arrangement with two parallel subduction zones is unusual. The modern Philippine Islands are located on the Philippine Mobile Belt, one of the few places on Earth where twin subduction zones exist today. Geologists call the ocean between the Intermontane islands and North America the Slide Mountain Ocean. The name comes from the Slide Mountain Terrane, a region made of rocks from the floor of the ancient ocean.

Collision of the Intermontane Islands 
During the early Jurassic period, the Intermontane Islands and the Pacific Northwest drew closer together as the continent moved west and the Intermontane Microplate subducted. On the continent, subduction supported a new volcanic arc that again sent intruding granite-type rocks into the ancient continental sediments. Eventually, about 180 million years ago in the middle Jurassic, the last of the microplate subducted, and the Intermontane Islands collided with the Pacific Northwest.

The Intermontane Islands were too big to sink beneath the continent.  The subduction zone of the Intermontane Plate shut down, ending the volcanic arc.  As the Intermontane Belt accreted to the edge of the continent, the subduction zone of the Insular Plate became the active subduction zone along the edge of the continent.

External links
Burke Museum - University of Washington

Tectonic plates
Historical tectonic plates
Historical geology
Natural history of North America